Kraków John Paul II International Airport ( since 4 September 2007; earlier in )  is an international airport located near Kraków, in the village of Balice,  west of the city centre, in southern Poland. It is the second busiest airport of the country in terms of the volume of passengers served annually. The airport is named after Pope John Paul II.

History

Early years

The airport opened for civil aviation in 1964. The Balice airport was a military site until 28 February 1968. Four years later, the first passenger terminal was built there.

In 1988, the authorities decided to build a new terminal that was opened for public use in 1993. In 1995, the entire apron was modernized.

In 1995, the airport's name was changed from Kraków–Balice Airport to John Paul II International Airport Kraków–Balice, to honor Pope John Paul II, who spent many years of his life in Kraków and had served as Archbishop of Kraków from 1963 until his elevation to the Papacy in 1978. For marketing reasons, the official name was further "streamlined" on 4 September 2007 as Kraków Airport im. Jana Pawła II.

Development since the 2000s
The airport was modernized once more in 2002, and since then new international connections have been established.

In 2003, when Irish low-cost carrier Ryanair became interested in starting a service from the John Paul II International Airport, the airport authorities refused to reduce the landing fees. In response, the regional authorities of Kraków and Lesser Poland Voivodeship decided to build a new airport near the existing one, using the infrastructure of the military airbase adjacent to the shared runway. Finally, an agreement was reached, and the existing airport was opened to Ryanair and other low-cost carriers such as Germanwings, EasyJet, and Centralwings.

On 1 March 2007, a separate domestic terminal (T2) was opened. At that time, plans were underway to begin the construction of a new terminal.

A seven-storey parking garage opposite T1 became fully operational in May 2010.

On 12 December 2012, Irish low-cost carrier Ryanair announced it would be opening its second Polish base in Kraków basing two Boeing 737-800 aircraft at the airport from 31 March 2013, which allows the carrier to increase the number of the routes from Kraków to 31.

Kraków Airport is the second busiest airport in the country after Warsaw Chopin Airport. The airport has good growth prospects, as almost 8 million people live within  of it. The airport also has a favorable location on the network of existing and planned motorways in this region of Poland.

Facilities

Terminal
11 April 2013 saw the beginning of construction works of a new airport terminal, which is adjacent to the existing old terminal building. The works on the new terminal were completed in December 2016. The terminal serves all-year-round, 24 hours a day, both domestic as well as international flights. The expected maximum capacity of the terminal is up to 8 million passengers handled in a year (over twice as much as the airport served in 2012). It is also possible to handle transfer passengers irrespective of the routes (Schengen/Non-Schengen destinations). The terminal has a new luggage handling system and a roofed footbridge connecting the terminal to a hotel, a multi-level parking lot and the railway station, with direct railway link to Kraków Główny by Koleje Małopolskie.

Runway
The airport has one concrete runway, number 07/25, .

Airlines and destinations
The following airlines operate regular scheduled and charter flights at Kraków Airport:

Statistics

It was the 63rd busiest airport in Europe in 2019 and had the greatest increase in passengers in all of Europe in 2019 with a 24.2% passenger increase in 2019 compared to 2018.

Ground transportation

In addition to road access by private car or taxi, other options are:

Train
The SKA1 suburban line operates from the Airport to Kraków Główny (Main railway station) and further to Wieliczka. The service resumed in September 2015. It takes about 17 minutes to get to the city centre, and further 20 minutes to Wieliczka (for Salt Mine).

Bus
Public buses link the airport during the day and during the night with the main railway and bus station in Kraków (Kraków Główny railway station) and the ICE Congress Centre.

See also
 List of airports in Poland
 Air ambulances in Poland

References

External links

 Airport website 
 John Paul II International Airport, Krakow, Poland

Krakow-Balice, John Paul II International Airport
Buildings and structures in Lesser Poland Voivodeship
Airport
Pope John Paul II